NSB Class 5 or B5 is a series of passenger carriages built by Strømmens Værksted for the Norwegian State Railways. Built between 1977 and 1981, they went through a major upgrade between 2008 and 2012. Sixty-three units were delivered. They are used predominantly on the Dovre Line, the Nordland Line and the Vestfold Line.

Coach types before upgrade:

All A3s and BF13s, and some BF14s, are withdrawn.

Coach types after upgrade 2010-2012:

The first upgraded coaches were used on the Vestfold Line (Oslo-Skien) from 20 June 2011.

As of December 2013 only upgraded coaches are used in ordinary traffic with passengers, except a couple of old BF14 that are still used in combination with B3 coaches on the Oslo-Bergen line. A few old coaches have been transferred to Jernbaneverket and the Norwegian Railway Museum.

Renovation

As part of a larger renovation program which also included the B7 carriages and the Class 69 trains, 56 B5 cars were renovated at Bombardier Transportation's plant in Hungary. The purpose of the upgrade was to provide commuters along the Vestfold Line with an intermediate upgrade while waiting for the delivery of Class 74 electric multiple units which were scheduled for delivery in 2010. The set consists of seven sets of eight carriages. When the Class 74 trains are delivered, NSB will move the B5 cars to the Nordland Line and the Dovre Line, where they will also be equipped with a dining car.

The process is more than two years delayed, and the first set was planned to be delivered in 2008. With the new schedule, the last sets will be delivered in 2012. Upgrades include new, now closed, toilets, new seating, power outlets, air conditioning and NSB's new red, silver and orange livery. In addition, they will receive new bogies. After delivery, the carriages will have to be test-run for up to six months before being approved by the Norwegian Railway Inspectorate.

During the upgrade, asbestos was found, which was one of the main causes of the delay. Originally the upgrade was budgeted to cost 500 million Norwegian krone (NOK), but with the extra work the bill increased by NOK 200 million. Another cause was that NSB switched their supplier of heating, air conditioning and ventilation. In September 2009, Bombardier sued NSB in an arbitration, demanding NOK 172 million in extra payment. NSB, on the other hand, has sued Bombardier for the same amount of money. The companies have agreed on part of the compensation, although how much the total will be, is the issue of the case. Finally Bombardier had to pay NOK 73 million to NSB.

References

External links
 Tønsbergs Blad - Pictures of coaches upgraded in 2011
 Long distance trains in Norway - Train configurations and seating maps

Railway coaches of Norway
Vehicles introduced in 1977